The Polygonal Barn, Van Buren Township was a historic building located in Van Buren Township in rural Jackson County, Iowa, United States. It was built in 1920 by Gus Klenney as a sale barn. They house livestock that are shown and sold to buyers. It is not known what livestock were sold here. The building was octagonal in shape and measured  in diameter. It was listed on the National Register of Historic Places in 1986. The structure has subsequently been torn down.

References

Infrastructure completed in 1920
Buildings and structures in Jackson County, Iowa
Barns on the National Register of Historic Places in Iowa
Polygonal barns in the United States
National Register of Historic Places in Jackson County, Iowa
1920 establishments in Iowa